Melanie Edwards (born 1 April 1973) is a former association football player who represented New Zealand at international level.

Edwards made her Football Ferns début in a 15-0 World Cup qualifier win over Samoa on 7 April 2003, and made just one further appearance, in a 5–0 win over Papua New Guinea on 11 April that same year.

References

External links

1973 births
Living people
New Zealand women's international footballers
New Zealand women's association footballers

Women's association footballers not categorized by position